Montana (SSN-794) is a Virginia-class submarine of the United States Navy. She will honor the U.S. State of Montana. Secretary of the Navy Ray Mabus announced the name on 3 September 2015 at a ceremony hosted in Billings, Montana with U.S. Senator Jon Tester.

On 23 December 2014, they were awarded an additional $121.8 million contract modification to buy long lead-time material for the three Virginia-class submarines. The U.S. Navy awarded General Dynamics Electric Boat the contract to construct 10 Block IV Virginia-class submarines for $17.6 billion on 28 April 2014. The tenth boat is scheduled for delivery in 2023.

Construction of Montana began in May 2015 at Huntington Ingalls Newport News Shipbuilding in Virginia. Contract completion date was expected to be in May 2020, but this was delayed because of the COVID pandemic.

Sally Jewell, Montanas sponsor and former U.S. Interior Secretary, christened the vessel on 12 September 2020 at Newport News Shipbuilding, via a virtual ceremony due to the pandemic. Montana was rolled out on 15 October 2020 and will be delivered to the Navy by mid-2022. She was launched in February 2021, and was commissioned on 25 June 2022 at Naval Station Norfolk.

References

External links
 USS Montana Committee

Further reading
 Christley, Jim. US Nuclear Submarines: The Fast Attack. Oxford: Osprey Pub., 2007.  
 Clancy, Tom, and John Gresham. Submarine: A Guided Tour Inside a Nuclear Warship. New York, N.Y.: Berkley Books, 2002.  

 

Virginia-class submarines
Nuclear submarines of the United States Navy